is a former Japanese football player. His younger brother Masaya Kikawada is an actor.

Playing career
Kikawada was born in Niiza on October 28, 1974. After graduating from Asia University, he joined the Japan Football League club Consadole Sapporo in 1997. The club won second place in 1997 and was promoted to the J1 League in 1998. He played many matches as forward. In 2002, he moved to Kawasaki Frontale. Although he played many matches in 2002, his opportunity to play decreased in 2003 and he retired in August 2003.

Club statistics

References

External links

1974 births
Living people
Asia University (Japan) alumni
Association football people from Saitama Prefecture
Japanese footballers
J1 League players
J2 League players
Japan Football League (1992–1998) players
Hokkaido Consadole Sapporo players
Kawasaki Frontale players
Association football forwards